This is the list of Empire of Japan coastal fortresses in existence during World War II. Fortresses on Japanese archipelago were led by the Commander of the Japanese Metropolitan Fortification System whose headquarters was in Tokyo Bay Fortress.  The rest of exterior fortress system in the Provinces was managed in their respective Army or Navy command organizations.

Fortresses by location

Chishima and Karafuto
Kita Chishima Special Fortress (北千島臨時要塞)
Minami Chishima Fortress
Karafuto Fortress

Hokkaidō
Soya Special Fortress (宗谷臨時要塞)
Hakodate Fortress
Sapporo Fortress

East Honshu
Tsugaru Fortress (津軽要塞)
Nagano Fortress
Tokyo Bay Fortress (東京湾要塞)
Narashino Permanent Fort (永久堡塁 (習志野))
Chichijima Fortress (父島要塞)

West Honshu and Shikoku
Yura Fortress (由良要塞) at Tomogashima
Hiroshima Bay Fortress (広島湾要塞 or 呉要塞) - disarmed in 1926
Genyo Fortress (芸予要塞) at Ōkunoshima - disarmed in 1924
Nakajo-Wan Fortress
Hōyo Fortress (豊予要塞) at Hōyo Strait
Shimonoseki Fortress (下関要塞)
Maizuru Fortress (舞鶴要塞)
60th Fortress
61st Fortress
65th Fortress
66th Fortress

Kyushu and Okinawa
Tsushima Fortress (対馬要塞)
Iki Fortress (壱岐要塞)
Nagasaki Fortress (長崎要塞)
Sasebo Fortress (佐世保要塞) - merged in 1936 with Nagasaki.
Uchinoura special Fortress (内之浦臨時要塞)
Amami Ōshima fortress (奄美大島要塞)
Funauke Special Fortress (船浮臨時要塞) at Iriomote-jima
Karimata special Fortress (狩俣臨時要塞) at Miyako-jima
Nakagusuku Bay Fortress (中城湾臨時要塞)

Japanese colonies
Eiko bay Fortress (永興湾要塞) in Kumya County, North Korea
Keelung Fortress (基隆要塞)
Takao Fortress (高雄要塞) at Kaohsiung
Hōkotō Fortress (澎湖島要塞)at Penghu
Jinhae Bay Fortress (鎮海湾要塞)
Busan Fortress (釜山要塞)
 Rashin Fortress (羅津要塞) at Rason
 Ryojun Fortress (旅順要塞) at Lüshunkou District
 Reisui Special Fortress (麗水臨時要塞) at Yeosu

Army unit attached to the Fortress system

36th Fortress Engineer Regiment

Army Commanders in Fortress system

Kanji Ishiwara: Commanding Officer Maizuru Fortified Zone
Teiji Imamura: Commandant Tsushima Fortress
Koji Chichiwa: Commandant Iki Fortress

References

World War II, Coastal Fortresses
Japan, World War II, Coastal Fortresses
World War II, Coastal Fortresses
Coastal Fortresses
Fortresses